Diploderma yulongense is a species of lizard found in the Chinese province of Yunnan. It was first collected in 1914, but not recorded again in the wild until 2012, when it was described based on the original and new specimens.

References 

Diploderma
Lizards of Asia
Reptiles of China
Endemic fauna of Yunnan
Reptiles described in 2012
Taxa named by Ulrich Manthey
Taxa named by Wolfgang Denzer